Las Huacas is a corregimiento in Natá District, Coclé Province, Panama. Its population as of 1990 was 1,364; its population as of 2000 was 1,417.

References

Corregimientos of Coclé Province